Eupithecia actaeata is an Eurasian species of moth of the family Geometridae.

Description
E. actaeata has a wingspan of 19–24 mm, with broader wings than is typical for Eupithecia species. Both wing pairs are grey, brownish-grey, or brown, with somewhat paler hind- than forewings.

Subspecies
Eupithecia actaeata actaeata
Eupithecia actaeata praenubilata Inoue, 1958

Distribution

Europe
Within Europe, E. actaeata is found France eastwards, where it is widely distributed in northern, central and eastern Europe, and has only local distribution south of the Alps.

Asia
In Asia, E. actaeata ranges from the southern Urals to Mongolia, China (Qinghai and Shaanxi), Japan, the Russian Far East, Taiwan and Korea.

Habitat and host plants
E. actaeata has been found at altitudes from sea level up to 2000 m in Europe and between 1600 and 3000 m in China. It is found in forests with a presence of Actaea spicata (baneberry), its main host plant. In north-western Europe, it is found predominantly in closed spruce forests. In Asia, it has been found on another species of Actaea. Other known host plants are Thalictrum aquilegiifolium and Thalictrum flavum. Viburnum opulus has also been mentioned in scientific literature, but might be erroneous.

Life cycle
There are two generations per year with adults on wing from the end of May to August. Larvae can be found from June to September. It overwinters as a pupa.

References

External links

Fauna Europaea
Lepiforum.de
Swedish Moths

Moths described in 1869
actaeata
Moths of Asia
Moths of Europe